Ned Thomas Beatty (July 6, 1937 – June 13, 2021) was an American actor. In a career that spanned five decades, he appeared in more than 160 films. Throughout his career, Beatty gained a reputation for being "the busiest actor in Hollywood". His film appearances included Deliverance (1972), White Lightning (1973), All the President's Men (1976), Network (1976), Superman (1978), Superman II (1980), Back to School (1986), Rudy (1993), Shooter (2007), and Toy Story 3 (2010).
Beatty was nominated for an Academy Award, two Emmy Awards, an MTV Movie Award for Best Villain, and a Golden Globe Award; he also won a Drama Desk Award.

Early life
Beatty was born on July 6, 1937, in Louisville, Kentucky, to Margaret (née Fortney) and Charles William Beatty. He had an older sister, Mary. In 1947, Beatty began singing in gospel and barbershop quartets in St. Matthews, Kentucky, and at his local church. He received a scholarship to sing in the a cappella choir at Transylvania University in Lexington, Kentucky; he attended but did not graduate.

In 1956, Beatty made his stage debut at age 19, appearing in Wilderness Road, an outdoor-historical pageant located in Berea, Kentucky. During his first ten years of theater, he worked at Barter Theatre in Abingdon, Virginia, the State Theatre of Virginia. Returning to Kentucky, Beatty worked in the Louisville area through the mid-1960s, at the Clarksville Little Theater (Indiana) and the newly founded Actors Theater of Louisville. His time at the latter included a run as Willy Loman in Death of a Salesman in 1966.

Career
Throughout his career, Beatty had no regrets about mostly only playing supporting roles: "[Leading roles] are more trouble than they're worth. I feel sorry for people in a star position. It's unnatural".

1970s

In 1972, Beatty made his film debut as Bobby Trippe in Deliverance, starring Jon Voight and Burt Reynolds, and set in northern Georgia. Beatty's character is forced to strip at gunpoint by two mountain men who humiliate and rape him, a scene so shocking that it is still referred to as a screen milestone. Beatty admitted that most of the people who worked on the film did not want to do that scene, but it was an important one. The film was the fifth highest grossing that year, and also featured Duelling Banjos as its theme tune, which went on to be a number one hit record. In 1972, he also appeared in The Life and Times of Judge Roy Bean, a western with Paul Newman.

In 1973, Beatty had roles in The Thief Who Came to Dinner, The Last American Hero, and White Lightning. The latter film reunited Beatty with his Deliverance co-star Burt Reynolds. He also appeared in an episode of the TV series The Waltons that year, as well as the TV movie The Marcus-Nelson Murders, which was the pilot for the series Kojak. The next year, he appeared in the television miniseries The Execution of Private Slovik and in the two-part episode of The Rockford Files, "Profit and Loss". In 1975, he appeared in W.W. and the Dixie Dancekings, in Robert Altman's Nashville, and as Colonel Hollister in the M*A*S*H episode, "Dear Peggy". He appeared in the NBC-TV movie Attack on Terror: The FBI vs. the Ku Klux Klan as Deputy Sheriff Ollie Thompson (1975). Beatty also made an appearance on Gunsmoke in "The Hiders" episode in 1975.

Beatty received his only Academy Award nomination, for Best Supporting Actor category for the acclaimed film Network (1976), portraying a television network's bombastic but shrewd chairman of the board who convinces the mad Howard Beale character (portrayed by Peter Finch) that corporation-led global dehumanization is not only inevitable, but is also a good thing. Neither Beatty nor William Holden, who shared the lead role with Finch, won an Oscar. The other three acting awards besides the best supporting actor category were swept by Network performers: Best Actor for Peter Finch, Best Actress for Faye Dunaway, and Best Supporting Actress for Beatrice Straight. The Best Supporting Actor award went to Jason Robards for his role in All the President's Men, which also starred Beatty.

In 1976, he also appeared in The Big Bus, Silver Streak,  and Mikey and Nicky. In 1977, he returned to work with John Boorman in Exorcist II: The Heretic (1977), and appeared in "The Final Chapter", the first episode of the television series Quinn Martin's Tales of the Unexpected. During 1977-78, he starred in the short-lived sitcom Szysznyk on CBS.

In 1978, Beatty appeared in Gray Lady Down (1978), a drama aboard a submarine starring Charlton Heston. The film is significant chiefly for being the screen debut of Christopher Reeve, Beatty's future costar. Later that year, Beatty was cast by Richard Donner to portray Lex Luthor's inept henchman Otis in Superman: The Movie (1978), as he would in the 1980 sequel, where we see his character being left behind in prison. He received his first nomination for Emmy Award for Outstanding Lead Actor in a Miniseries or a Special for the television series Friendly Fire (1979). In 1979, he was also seen in Wise Blood, directed by John Huston, and 1941, directed by Steven Spielberg.

1980s
In 1980, Beatty appeared in Ronald Neame's film Hopscotch with Walter Matthau. In 1981, Beatty appeared in the comedy/science fiction film The Incredible Shrinking Woman, directed by Joel Schumacher and starring Lily Tomlin. In 1982, Beatty returned to work with Richard Donner and Richard Pryor in the comedy The Toy. Beatty worked with Burt Reynolds again in the auto-racing farce Stroker Ace (1983).

In the middle of the 1980s, Beatty appeared in the comedy film Restless Natives (1985), directed by Michael Hoffman. By the end of the 1980s, Beatty appeared in another comedy film, as the academic "Dean Martin" in Back to School (1986), starring Rodney Dangerfield. He played a corrupt cop in the 1987 American neo-noir crime film The Big Easy, directed by Jim McBride and starring Dennis Quaid, and continued with a spy drama, The Fourth Protocol (1987), opposite Michael Caine and Pierce Brosnan.

In 1988, Beatty appeared with the main character Thelonious Pitt in Shadows in the Storm, and reunited with Burt Reynolds and Christopher Reeve for the comedy film Switching Channels, his fifth time in a movie with Reynolds. He appeared in Purple People Eater (1988), portraying a simple grandfather. In 1989, Beatty made Chattahoochee, portraying Dr. Harwood. He had a recurring role as the father of John Goodman's character Dan Conner on the TV comedy series Roseanne (1989–1994).

1990s

Entering the 1990s, Beatty gained his third nomination for an Emmy Award for Outstanding Supporting Actor in a Miniseries or a Special category for Last Train Home (1990). A year later, he appeared in the British film Hear My Song (1991), in which he portrayed tenor Josef Locke, for which he was nominated for a Golden Globe Award for Best Supporting Actor – Motion Picture.

In 1990, Beatty worked again with Linda Blair in Repossessed (1990), a spoof of The Exorcist. He appeared in the Marvel Comics superhero adventure Captain America (1990). He portrayed the father of the bride in Prelude to a Kiss (1992), opposite Meg Ryan and Alec Baldwin. In 1993, he appeared in the true story based film Rudy, playing a Notre Dame Fighting Irish football fan whose son, against all odds, makes the school's football team. In 1992, he played Blanche Devereaux's developmentally disabled older brother in the TV show The Golden Palace. Beatty starred in the television series Homicide: Life on the Street as Detective Stanley Bolander for its first three seasons (1993–1995).

Beatty made the 1994 science-fiction film Replikator (1994) and mystery-comedy Radioland Murders. In 1995, he worked with Sean Connery and Laurence Fishburne in the thriller Just Cause. He appeared as Judge Roy Bean in the TV miniseries adaptation of Larry McMurtry's western novel, Streets of Laredo (1995). He appeared in a 1998 sports-drama film written and directed by Spike Lee and starring Denzel Washington, He Got Game. In 1999, Beatty returned to work with Cookie's Fortune, Life, and Spring Forward.

2000s
In the beginning of the 2000s, he was a member of the original cast of the television police drama reunion film Homicide: The Movie (2000), reprising his role of Detective Stanley Bolander. In 2002, he appeared in Peter Hewitt's film Thunderpants. In 2003, he portrayed a simple sheriff in Where the Red Fern Grows.

Beatty also enjoyed a career as a stage actor, including a run in the Broadway and London productions of Cat on a Hot Tin Roof with Brendan Fraser and Frances O'Connor. He won a Drama Desk Award for Outstanding Featured Actor in a Play for playing Big Daddy in a production of Cat on a Hot Tin Roof.

In the middle of the 2000s, Beatty appeared in the television film The Wool Cap (2004) with William H. Macy, and in 2005, in an American independent film directed and written by Ali Selim, Sweet Land. In March 2006, Beatty received the RiverRun International Film Festival's "Master of Cinema" Award (the highest honor of the festival), in Winston-Salem, North Carolina.

At the end of the 2000s, Beatty portrayed a corrupt U.S. Senator in the film version of Stephen Hunter's novel Point of Impact retitled Shooter (2007), directed by Antoine Fuqua and starring Mark Wahlberg, Michael Peña, and Danny Glover; in a drama film written and directed by Paul Schrader, The Walker (2007), and as the honorable U.S. Congressman Doc Long in the true story Charlie Wilson's War (2007), with Tom Hanks and Julia Roberts, directed by Mike Nichols. He also worked with Tommy Lee Jones in the thriller In the Electric Mist (2009).

2010s
In 2010, Beatty starred in the thriller The Killer Inside Me (2010), which was part of the Sundance Film Festival. He also voiced Lots-O'-Huggin' Bear in the 2010 Disney/Pixar film Toy Story 3 (2010) opposite Charlie Wilson’s War costar Tom Hanks, who was reprising his role of Woody from the first two films. In 2011, Beatty worked with actor Johnny Depp and director Gore Verbinski in the computer-animated film Rango (2011), playing the role of Tortoise John. He appeared briefly in the film Funny Guy and in the film Rampart (2011), opposite Woody Harrelson, which is set in 1999 Los Angeles. Beatty's final television appearance was in sitcom television series Go On (2013), starring Matthew Perry.

Beatty's next film was The Big Ask (2013), a dark comedy about three couples who head to the desert to help their friend heal after the death of his mother. The film featured Gillian Jacobs, Zachary Knighton, David Krumholtz, Melanie Lynskey, Ahna O'Reilly, and Jason Ritter, and was directed by his son Thomas Beatty and Rebecca Fishman. His other next movie was Baggage Claim (2013), an American comedy film directed by David E. Talbert and written by Talbert based on his book of the same name, opposite Paula Patton, Adam Brody, Djimon Hounsou, Taye Diggs, Christina Milian and Derek Luke, which was also Beatty's final film role before his retirement.

Personal life and death
Beatty was married four times. His first wife was Walta Chandler; they were married from 1959 until 1968 and had four children. His second wife was actress Belinda Rowley; they were married from 1971 to 1979 and had two children. His third wife was Dorothy Adams "Tinker" Lindsay; they were married from June 28, 1979, to March 1998 and had two children. His fourth wife was Sandra Johnson; they were married on November 20, 1999, and lived in Los Angeles, California. They also maintained a residence in Karlstad, Minnesota.

Beatty was not related to fellow Hollywood star Warren Beatty, also born in 1937. When asked if they were related, Beatty had been known to joke that Warren was his "illegitimate uncle".

On June 29, 2012, Beatty attended a 40th anniversary screening of Deliverance at Warner Bros., with Burt Reynolds, Ronny Cox and Jon Voight.

He supported Jesse Jackson's 1988 presidential campaign.

Beatty died of natural causes at his home in Los Angeles, on June 13, 2021, at the age of 83.

Filmography

Film

Television

Video games

Theater

Awards
During his career, Beatty got his first nomination for an Academy Award in Best Supporting Actor category for Network (1976), portraying Arthur Jensen. His second nomination, an Emmy Award, came for Friendly Fire (1979) in 'Outstanding Lead Actor in a Miniseries or a Special' category and the third nomination is another Emmy Award for 'Outstanding Supporting Actor in a Miniseries or a Special' category for Last Train Home (1990). He got the fourth major award nomination for a Golden Globe Award in category Best Supporting Actor – Motion Picture for Hear My Song (1990), portraying the Irish tenor Josef Locke and his fifth nomination for a MTV Movie Award in Best Villain category in the voice of antagonist Lots-O'-Huggin' Bear in Toy Story 3 (2010).

He won a Drama Desk Award for Cat on a Hot Tin Roof (2004) in Outstanding Featured Actor in a Play category.

Won

Drama Desk Award
Outstanding Featured Actor in a Play – Cat on a Hot Tin Roof (2004)

Nominated

Academy Award
Best Supporting Actor – Network (1976)

Emmy Award
Outstanding Lead Actor in a Miniseries or a Special – Friendly Fire (1979)
Outstanding Supporting Actor in a Miniseries or a Special – Last Train Home (1990)

Golden Globe Award
Best Supporting Actor – Motion Picture – Hear My Song (1991)

MTV Movie Award
MTV Movie Award for Best Villain – Toy Story 3 (2010)

See also
 List of people from the Louisville metropolitan area

References

External links

 
 
 
 
 Ned Beatty Interview by Beth Stevens on Broadway.com
 

1937 births
2021 deaths
20th-century American male actors
21st-century American male actors
American male film actors
American male stage actors
American male television actors
American male voice actors
Drama Desk Award winners
Leo Ryan
Male actors from Louisville, Kentucky
People from Kittson County, Minnesota
People from Tulare County, California
Transylvania University alumni